Guerreros de Acapulco were a Mexican football club that played in the Segunda División Profesional. The club was based in Acapulco de Juarez, Guerrero.

History
In 1987, Guerreros de Acapulco purchased the franchise from Iguala FC, permitting them to play in the third-tier Segunda División 'B' for the 1987–88 season.

In 1990, they achieved promotion to Segunda División 'A' as runners-up in the championship phase. They only lasted one year in the second tier before being relegated.

Guerreros de Acapulco were founding members of the new second division, Primera División A, and played in its inaugural 1994–95 season.

Guerreros de Acapulco was re-formed by Grupo Pegaso which played in Cancún, Quintana Roo. They soon moved to Acapulco, Guerrero and then once again to Oaxaca de Juárez, Oaxaca.

In Acapulco, they played at the Unidad Deportiva Acapulco. However, the team and the state government were unable to agree on the teams business. The state government of Oaxaca had agreed to help them move and would play at Estadio Benito Juárez playing with the same brand name starting in the Clausura 2012.

After one season, Guerreros de Acapulco disbanded in 2012.

Coaches
Salvador Carmona 2009–2012
Mario "Pichojos" Perez  2012

Stadium
 Estadio Unidad Deportiva Acapulco (2009—2012)
 Estadio Benito Juárez (2012)

See also
Football in Mexico

References

External links
Official Page

Acapulco
Football clubs in Guerrero
2012 disestablishments in Mexico
Association football clubs disestablished in 2012